A Fantastic Woman is a 2017 drama film directed by Sebastián Lelio, written by Lelio and Gonzalo Maza. Produced by Juan de Dios and Pablo Larraín, the film stars Daniela Vega and Francisco Reyes. It won the Academy Award for Best Foreign Language Film at the 90th Oscars and competed for the Golden Bear at the 67th Berlin International Film Festival.

Plot
Marina is a young transgender woman living in Santiago, Chile. She works as a singer and a waitress and is in a relationship with an older man named Orlando. They have recently moved in together, and on Marina's birthday, Orlando gives her a note promising tickets to a famous resort as a gift. However, Orlando wakes up in the middle of the night feeling unwell and stumbles down a flight of stairs. Marina takes him to the hospital, but he dies of a brain aneurysm.

Marina contacts Orlando's brother, Gabo, and is later picked up by the police. The officers call her 'sir' after checking her old ID card and demand an explanation for her sudden departure from the hospital. Gabo arrives and speaks to Marina with enough familiarity to convince the police of her innocence. He lets her take Orlando's car home.

Orlando's ex-wife, Sonia, contacts Marina to arrange a time for her to drop off Orlando's car. While working, Marina is visited by a detective named Adriana, who works on cases that include sexual assault. Adriana suggests that Orlando was paying Marina as a sex worker rather than the two dating. She also thinks Marina may have caused Orlando's bruises while defending herself from a violent encounter.

Marina returns home, where she is comforted by Orlando's dog, Diabla. Orlando's son, Bruno, arrives and harasses Marina with personal questions. He decides to take the dog despite Marina's protestations. Marina takes the car to be washed and "sees" Orlando, which disturbs her. She then meets Sonia in a car park and hands over the car. Sonia becomes upset and asks Marina to hand over the flat as soon as possible. She tells Marina not to go to the funeral.

Gabo calls Marina and tells her that Orlando will be cremated, and he wants her to have some of the ashes. Marina prepares to move out of Orlando's apartment and attends the wake. Upon her arrival, Sonia demands that Marina leave, and Gabo follows her out and apologizes. Later, Bruno and his friends accost Marina, threatening and wrapping her face in scotch tape before leaving her in an alleyway. Marina then walks to a gay club where she meets a man and spends the night with Wanda and Gastón.

The next day, Marina discovers the details of Orlando's funeral in the newspaper. Wanda and Gastón warn her to let it go, but she decides to visit a sauna where Orlando had left a numbered key. She nervously enters the sauna and books in before locating the lockers and opening Orlando's, only to find it empty.

After the funeral ceremony, Marina is confronted by Orlando's family who insult her, prompting her to climb on top of their car and demand her dog back. She follows an employee into the morgue and sees Orlando's body before his cremation.

In the final scene, Marina is seen running with Diabla and later singing an opera recital to a packed audience.

Cast
 Daniela Vega as Marina Vidal
 Francisco Reyes as Orlando Onetto Partier
 Luis Gnecco as Gabriel Onetto Partier
 Aline Küppenheim as Sonia Bunster
 Amparo Noguera as Adriana Cortés
 Nicolás Saavedra as Bruno Onetto Bunster
 Antonia Zegers as Alessandra
 Trinidad González as Wanda Vidal
 Néstor Cantillana as Gastón 
 Alejandro Goic as Doctor
 Sergio Hernández as piano teacher
 Roberto Farías as medic in SML
 Marcial Tagle as Orlando's relative
 Pablo Cerda as Pablo
 Erto Pantoja as police man
 Paola Lattus as nurse

Release

A Fantastic Woman premiered at the 67th Berlin International Film Festival on 12 February 2017. The movie won the Silver Bear for Best Screenplay and the Teddy Award, which is given to films with an LGBT theme. Two days prior to the premiere, Sony Pictures Classics acquired the distribution rights for the film.

Reception
The film holds a 94% approval rating on review aggregation website Rotten Tomatoes, based on 221 reviews, with an average rating of 8.10/10. The website's critical consensus reads, "Subtle and tender, A Fantastic Woman handles its timely, sensitive subject matter with care." It holds a score of 86 out of 100 on Metacritic based on 43 reviews, indicating "universal acclaim".

Chilean LBGTQ activists used A Fantastic Woman's Oscar win to accelerate local discussions on a gender identity bill. Subsequently, Chile approved laws allowing transgender citizens to change their official details in late 2018. According to political scientists Carsten-Andreas Schulz and Cameron G. Thies, the international recognition of the film temporarily made support for trans rights a matter of national pride in Chile, which opened a window of opportunity for the approval of the law.

Accolades
A Fantastic Woman received a nomination for Best Foreign Language Film at the 90th Academy Awards, and became the first Chilean film to win the award in this category. It was the second Chilean film to win an Oscar, after Bear Story in 2016.

See also
 List of submissions to the 90th Academy Awards for Best Foreign Language Film
 List of Chilean submissions for the Academy Award for Best Foreign Language Film

References

External links
 
 
 

2017 films
2017 drama films
2017 LGBT-related films
2010s Spanish-language films
American drama films
American LGBT-related films
Best Foreign Language Film Academy Award winners
Chilean drama films
Chilean LGBT-related films
Films about gender
Films about trans women
Films directed by Sebastián Lelio
Films set in Chile
Films shot in Chile
German drama films
German LGBT-related films
Independent Spirit Award for Best Foreign Film winners
LGBT-related drama films
Spanish drama films
Spanish LGBT-related films
Films scored by Matthew Herbert
Sony Pictures Classics films
Films about singers
2010s American films
2010s German films
2010s Chilean films
2010s Spanish films